The 2017–18 Svenska Cupen was the 62nd season of the Svenska Cupen and the sixth season with the current format. The winners of the competition earned a place in the second qualifying round of the 2018–19 UEFA Europa League, unless they had already qualified for European competition in the 2018–19 season, in which case the qualification spot went to fourth-placed team of the 2017 Allsvenskan. A total of 96 clubs entered the competition.

The first two rounds were played between 7 June and 10 October 2017 respectively. The first round draw was announced on 20 March 2017, and the draw for the second round was announced on 3 August 2017. The group stage was played on the last two weekends in February 2018, and the last group stage round was played on 3 and 4 March 2018. The following quarter-finals and semi-finals were played on the weekends of 10 March and 17 March 2018 respectively, before the tournament ended with the final on 10 May 2018. Times up to 28 October 2017 and from 25 March 2018 are CEST (UTC+2). Times from 29 October 2017 to 24 March 2018 are CET (UTC+1).

Djurgårdens IF won their fifth Svenska Cupen title on 10 May 2018 after defeating Malmö FF 3–0.

Round and draw dates
The schedule of the competition is as follows.

Teams

Round 1
64 teams from the third tier or lower of the Swedish league system competed in this round. The matches were played on 2 August 2017 at the latest.

Round 2
64 teams from all levels the Swedish league system competed in this round. The 32 match winners from Round 1 were joined by the 16 teams of the 2017 Superettan and the 16 teams of the top-flight 2017 Allsvenskan. The draw was held on August 3, 2017  and the matches were played on August 23 and 24, 2017.

Group stage
The 32 winners from round 2 were divided into eight groups of four teams. The 16 highest ranked winners from the previous rounds were seeded to the top two positions in each groups and the 16 remaining winners were unseeded in the draw. The ranking of the 16 seeded teams were decided by league position in the 2017 season. All teams in the group stage played each other once, the highest ranked teams from the previous rounds and teams from tier three or lower had the right to play two home matches.

Qualified teams

Seeded
AIK (1)
BK Häcken (1)
Djurgårdens IF (1)
GIF Sundsvall (1)
Halmstads BK (1)
Hammarby IF (1)
IF Brommapojkarna (2)
IF Elfsborg (1)
IFK Göteborg (1)
IFK Norrköping (1)
IK Sirius (1)
Jönköpings Södra IF (1)
Kalmar FF (1)
Malmö FF (1)
Örebro SK (1)
Östersunds FK (1)

Unseeded
Dalkurd FF (2)
Degerfors IF (2)
GAIS (2)
Gefle IF (2)
Helsingborgs IF (2)
IFK Värnamo (2)
IK Frej Täby (2)
IK Oddevold (3)	
Norrby IF (2)
Syrianska FC (2)
Trelleborgs FF (2)
Tvååkers IF (4)
Varbergs BoIS (2)
Vasalunds IF (3)
Åtvidabergs FF (2)
Östers IF (2)

Group 1

Group 2

Group 3

Group 4

Group 5

Group 6

Group 7

Group 8

Knock-out stage

Qualified teams

Bracket

Quarter-finals
The quarter-finals consisted of the eight teams that won their respective group in the previous round. The four best group winners were seeded and drawn against the other four group winners, with the seeded teams entitled to play the match at their home venue. GAIS was the lowest ranked team in the quarter-finals as they are playing in the second tier, Superettan, for the 2018 season, while the other teams are playing in the top tier, Allsvenskan.

The draw for the quarter-finals and semi-finals was held on 4 March 2018.

Semi-finals
The semi-finals consisted of the four teams that won their respective quarter-finals in the previous round. All teams that qualified to this round are playing in the top tier, Allsvenskan, for the 2018 season.

The draw for the quarter-finals and semi-finals was held on 4 March 2018.

Final

References

Svenska Cupen seasons
Cupen
Cupen
Sweden